Abū al-Ḥasan Alī ibn al-Abbās ibn Jūrayj, also known as Ibn al-Rūmī (born Baghdad in 836; died 896), was the grandson of George the Greek (Jūraij or Jūrjis i.e. Georgius) and a popular Arab poet of Baghdād in the Abbāsid-era.  

By the age of twenty he earned a living from his poetry.  His many political patrons included the governor Ubaydallah ibn Abdallah ibn Tahir, Abbasid caliph Al-Mu'tamid's minister the Persian Isma'il ibn Bulbul, and the politically influential Nestorian family Banū Wahb. In the tenth century his Dīwān (collected poetry), which had been transmitted orally by al-Mutanabbī, was arranged and edited by Abū Bakr ibn Yaḥyā al-Ṣūlī, and included in the section of his book Kitāb Al-Awrāq on muḥadathūn (modern poets).

Early life 
Ibn al-Rumi was born in Baghdad, then the capital of the Abbasid Caliphate, in 836. Originally named Ali bin Al-Abbas bin George, he was given the epithet "Ibn al-Rumi" (lit. "Son of the Roman), referring to his father's Greek ancestry. He was raised a Muslim.

Death 
Ibn al-Rumi died in Baghdad in the year 896, at the age of 59. His early biographer Ibn Khallikān relates an account that he was given poisoned biscuits in the presence of the caliph Al-Mu'tadid on the orders of his vizier, Al-Qasim ibn Ubayd Allah, whom Ibn al-Rumī had satirised viciously. In another account his death is attributed to suicide.

References

Bibliography

 El-Huni, Ali A., 'The poetry of Ibn al-Rùmī' (unpublished Ph.D. thesis, University of Glasgow, 1996)
  [Ibn al-Rumi],  [Diwan al-Rumi], 3 vols (Beirut: Dār al-Kutub al-ʻIlmīyah, 2009), https://archive.org/details/waq74354
 Ibn al-Rūmī, Selections from the Diwan of Ibn Al Rumi (William Penn College, 1977)

836 births
896 deaths
Poets from the Abbasid Caliphate
9th-century people from the Abbasid Caliphate
9th-century Arabic poets
Arab people of Greek descent
People from Baghdad